Steregushchy was one of 29 s (officially known as Project 7) built for the Soviet Navy during the late 1930s. Completed in 1939, she was assigned to the Baltic Fleet. The ship played a minor role in the Winter War of 1939–1940 against the Finns. After the start of the German invasion of the Soviet Union (Operation Barbarossa) in June 1941, Steregushchy participated in the Gulf of Riga Campaign. The ship briefly provided naval gunfire support during the Siege of Leningrad before she was sunk by German dive bombers on 21 September. Her wreck was refloated in 1944, although the repairs were not completed until 1948. Steregushchy was broken up for scrap in 1959.

Design and description
Having decided to build the large and expensive   destroyer leaders, the Soviet Navy sought Italian assistance in designing smaller and cheaper destroyers.

Their crew numbered 197 officers and sailors in peacetime and 236 in wartime. The designers had been conservative in rating the turbines and many, but not all, of the ships handily exceeded their designed speed during their sea trials. Others fell considerably short of it. Steregushchy reached  during trials in 1948.

As built, the Gnevny-class ships mounted four  B-13 guns in two pairs of superfiring single mounts fore and aft of the superstructure. Anti-aircraft defense was provided by a pair of  34-K AA guns in single mounts and a pair of  21-K AA guns as well as two  DK or DShK machine guns. They carried six  torpedo tubes in two rotating triple mounts; each tube was provided with a reload. The ships could also carry a maximum of either 60 or 95 mines and 25 depth charges. The ships were equipped with two K-1 paravanes intended to destroy mines and a pair of depth-charge throwers.

Construction and service 
Built in Leningrad's Shipyard No. 190 (Zhdanov) as yard number 516, Steregushchy was laid down on 12 August 1936 and launched on 18 June 1938. The ship was completed on 30 October 1939. and assigned to the Baltic Fleet. After the Winter War began on 30 November, she bombarded Finnish coastal defense positions on Saarenpää Island, part of the Beryozovye Islands, on 10 and 18–19 December, in conjunction with other ships.

When the Germans invaded the Soviet Union on 22 June 1941, Steregushchy was assigned to the 1st Destroyer Division of the Light Forces Detachment, based in Ust-Dvinsk, Latvia. After Steregushchy detonated two mines with her paravanes that knocked out one of her turbines, she accompanied Maxim Gorky to Tallinn, Estonia. On 2 July the destroyer helped to lay a minefield near Gogland Island. Steregushchy participated in an unsuccessful attack on a group of German landing craft off the mouth of the Daugava River on 13 July. Two days later, the ship was attacked by German bombers in the Väike Strait between Muhu and Saaremaa Islands. Shockwaves from four near misses dimpled plates in her hull, but caused no significant damage.

Under the flag of Light Forces detachment commander Kontr-admiral (Rear Admiral) Valentin Drozd, she and the destroyer  covered minelaying by the guard ships Tucha and Sneg on 18 July. By 14:00 of that day they returned to the Kübasaar roadstead near Saaremaa, but quickly turned back after receiving a message that a German convoy had been spotted. Due a lack of coordination with Soviet Naval Aviation, both destroyers came under friendly air attack and at 15:31 a bomb dropped by a Tupolev SB bomber exploded close to Serdity, knocking out a boiler and both rangefinders in the conning tower. Steregushchy, which escaped unscathed, engaged the German convoy escorts, but was only joined by Serdity at 17:24 after they had lost sight of the convoy.

On 11 August Steregushchy was one of the escorts for the passenger ship  as she steamed from Tallinn to Kronstadt when they entered a minefield. The destroyer had one of her fuel tanks flooded when a mine detonated in her starboard paravane. After the transport was damaged by a mine off Gogland, she was towed to Kronstadt by Steregushchy. After repairs, the ship supported the defenders of Leningrad with 350 shells from her main guns. On 21 September, she was attacked by Junkers Ju 87 Stuka dive bombers of StG 2. Hit three times, the bombs disabled one engine and quickly flooded the aft boiler room. Her captain took her into shallow water where she capsized to starboard, 15 minutes after being hit. A single 130 mm gun and some parts were salvaged by divers in October to repair the destroyer . The wreck was refloated in June 1944 and it was drydocked on 20 July for repairs that lasted until 1948. Steregushchy was stricken from the Navy List on 28 January 1958 and scrapped the following year.

Citations

Sources

Further reading
 

Gnevny-class destroyers
1938 ships
Ships built at Severnaya Verf
Destroyers sunk by aircraft
Ships sunk by German aircraft
Maritime incidents in September 1941
Cold War destroyers of the Soviet Union